In Catalan mythology, Comte Estruch—also known as Arnald Estruc or Wilfred Estruch—was a 12th-century Catalan noble who became a vampire.  

This legend is the oldest vampire tale in European history and is one of the few Spanish myths associated with vampirism.

Legend

The legend says that King Alfons II of Aragon sent the old noble Count Arnald Estruc to fight paganism and witchcraft at Llers Castle (Alt Emporda) where the Count was killed in 1173. Having led an un-Christian life, after his death the Count become a demonic being. Count Estruch sucked blood from the villagers in the area and seduced and impregnated young women. After nine months, these women would give birth to monstrous newborns who were dead at birth.

According to the legend Count Estruch terrorized the villagers for several years until he was finally killed.  In one version, he was slain by an elderly nun. in other versions, a Jewish hermit killed the count using ancient rituals from the Kabbalah. The castle was destroyed during the Spanish Civil War .

Adaptations
This legend was popularized in the novels of Salvador Sainz (Estruch, El cine Dracula), and in a few short stories by the same author (The daughters of Estruc, The host of Estruc, Strigoiaca, The ring of Estruc, The cellars of Marcia....). These stories were published in a book, Count Estruc's tales.

References

 Dossier Vampirismo de Tali Carreto Revista Freek, Cádiz (20 de febrero de 2006)
 El gran libro de los vampiros de Angel Gordon, Morales y Torres editores.
 Vampiros, mito y realidad de los no-muertosde Miguel C. Aracil, Editorial Edaf, S.A.
 Vampiros: magia póstuma dentro y fuera de España de Jordi Ardanuy. Barcelona, Luna Negra, 1994.
 Salvador Sáinz : Estruch, 1991.
 Salvador Sáinz : Los cuentos del conde Estruc, 2019.
 Salvador Sáinz : Los vampìros, reyes de la noche, 2019.

External links
 Origenes del Conde Estruc | L'elefant Trompeta

Vampires
Catalan mythology